The  Little League World Series, held in South Williamsport, Pennsylvania, took place between August 18 and August 28, one day later than originally scheduled. Inclement weather forced the cancellation of the third-place game on August 27 and the postponement of the championship game also scheduled for that date. The Northern Little League of Columbus, Georgia, defeated Kawaguchi City Little League of Kawaguchi, Japan, in the championship game of the 60th Little League World Series.

The event was broadcast in the United States on ABC Sports, ESPN and ESPN2 in both analog and high-definition. The U.S. Championship game was the last ABC Sports telecast. Games were held in the two stadiums located at Little League headquarters in South Williamsport:
Howard J. Lamade Stadium — the main stadium, opened in 1959, with seating for 10,000 in the stands and hillside terrace seating for up to 30,000 more
Little League Volunteer Stadium — a newer facility, opened in 2001, that seats slightly over 5,000, primarily in the stands

Teams

Between five and twelve teams take part in 16 regional qualification tournaments, which vary in format depending on region. In the United States, the qualification tournaments are in the same format as the Little League World Series itself: a round-robin tournament followed by an elimination round to determine the regional champion.

Results

Pool play
The top two teams in each pool moved on to their respective semifinals. The winners of each met on August 27 to play for the Little League World Championship. Teams marked in green qualified to the knockout stage. Ties are broken based on records in head-to-head competition among tied teams. If a clear winner cannot be determined from head-to-head results, the tie is broken by calculating the ratio of runs allowed to defensive innings played for all teams involved in the tie. The team with the lowest runs-per-defensive-inning ratio advances.

United States

Great Lakes wins pool based on defensive run ratio. Southeast is the runner-up based on win against West.

New England wins Pool B based on head-to-head tiebreaker.

All times US EDT

 The New England vs. Midwest game was postponed due to a rain delay and was played on August 20.

International

All times US EDT

 Asterisk (*) denotes no-hitter thrown
 The Pacific vs. Latin America game was suspended in the 8th inning due to a rain delay and was completed on August 21.

Elimination round

 
The consolation game between Matamoros, Mexico and Beaverton, Oregon, scheduled for August 27 at Volunteer Stadium, was cancelled due to rain, and both teams share third place. The championship game was originally scheduled for 3:30 pm US EDT on August 27, but was postponed due to rain. The game was originally rescheduled for 8:00 pm on August 28, but changed because of weather concerns.

Notable players
Gavin Cecchini (Lake Charles, Louisiana) (New York Mets)
Jace Fry (Beaverton, Oregon) (Chicago White Sox)
Scott Kingery (Ahwatukee, Phoenix) (Philadelphia Phillies)
Josh Lester (Columbus, Georgia) (Detroit Tigers)

Champion's path

The Columbus Northern LL went undefeated on their road to the LLWS, winning all eleven of their matches. Their total record was 16–1, their only loss coming against Lemont LL (from Illinois).

Mid-Island incident
Television coverage aired throughout the United States on ABC Sports and ESPN.  At first, there was no delay on its broadcasts, despite the fact that all managers and coaches were equipped with miniature microphones.  That changed after two incidents; one in a preliminary game where an unidentified California pitcher told his coach that "[the umpire] ain't giving me shit" in reference to a tight strike zone, but the other, more important incident took place late in a preliminary-round game in which a player for Mid-Island Little League of Staten Island, New York, who was not publicly identified, told his teammates to just score "one fucking run" that was broadcast live on ESPN.  In response, the team's manager, Nick Doscher, slapped the player, a violation of a Little League policy against physical contact targeting players.  Both the player and manager were reprimanded, and ESPN and ABC imposed a five-second delay on future telecasts.  The incident was part of the continuing legacy of the Super Bowl XXXVIII halftime show controversy.

See also
Little League
Little League World Series

References

External links
2006 official results via Wayback Machine

 
Little League World Series
Little League World Series
Little League World Series